The First Alaskans Institute is a non-profit foundation dedicated to developing the capacities of Alaska Natives and their communities to meet the educational, economic and social challenges of the future.  With a Board of Trustees composed of current and former presidents and chairs of the Alaska Federation of Natives, the Institute is committed to promoting healthy Native communities through public policy analysis/research and leadership development. The current President/CEO is La quen náay Liz Medicine Crow.

Alaska Native Policy Center
The Alaska Native Policy Center is a Native think tank of the First Alaskans Institute that provides  information on the condition and needs of Native people and assists Natives in becoming actively involved in the issues that impact the future.  The Policy Center has researched and published several reports, such as Alaska Native Perspectives, a survey of Native perceptions of public issues, Alaska Native K-12 Education Indicators Reports, a statistical review of Native educational performance; and Our Choices ~ Our Future, a compilation of data on Native population, health, economics and education.

Leadership development
First Alaskans also focuses on empowering the next generation of Native leaders through various leadership development programs - such as an annual "Elders and Youth Conference during AFN Convention week"; an annual summer internship program that provides challenging job experiences, leadership discussions and networking opportunities; and a fellowship program that nurtures emerging policy makers and uses the instruments of democracy to create social change.

See also
 Alaska Natives

References

Non-profit organizations based in Alaska
Alaska Native organizations
Native American organizations